Vladimír Martinec (born December 22, 1949) is a Czech retired ice hockey right wing who played both nationally and internationally in the 1970s and early 1980s. He won the Golden Hockey Stick award as top player in Czechoslovakia four times, in 1973, 1975, 1976, and 1979.

Martinec played for Pardubice in the Czechoslovak Elite League from 1967 to 1981 with the exception of the 1978–79 season, when he played for Jihlava. Nicknamed "the Fox" due to the unpredictability of his offensive manoeuvres, he scored 343 goals in 539 games in the elite league.

Martinec was a key player on the Czechoslovak national teams in the 1970s. Known for his technical skills, he scored 155 goals in 289 international games. He played in the World Championships every year in the 1970s and in 1981 (on the winning side in 1972, 1976, and 1977, and making the all-star team in 1974, 1975, 1976, and 1977); he is the 7th all-time leading scorer in World Championships with 110 points (52 goals and 58 assists) in 102 games (top scorer in 1976 with 20 points in 10 games).

He also played for Czechoslovakia in the 1972, 1976, and 1980 Winter Olympics, and in the 1976 Canada Cup where he scored 7 points (3+4) in 7 games.

He coached ESV Kaufbeuren in Germany (also coming back to play for this team in 1985), and then coached his old team Tesla Pardubice between 1986 and 1989.

Achievements & awards
IIHF World Championships 
 3-time world champion (1972,1976,1977)
4-time all-star right wing (1974–1977)
Top scorer and best forward in 1976
IIHF Hall of Fame (2001)
Izvestia Cup: Top scorer and best forward in 1979
Czechoslovak Elite League
On championship team (Pardubice) in 1973 
Top goal-scorer in 1979 (42 goals)
4-time winner of Golden Hockey Stick (Top player award); 1973, 1975, 1976, 1979

Career statistics

Regular season and playoffs

TCH totals do not include numbers from the 1967–68 to 1968–69 seasons.

International

References

External links
 
 
 
 

1949 births
Living people
Czech ice hockey right wingers
Czechoslovak ice hockey right wingers
Czech ice hockey coaches
Czech Republic men's national ice hockey team coaches
Czechoslovak ice hockey coaches
Olympic ice hockey players of Czechoslovakia
Olympic silver medalists for Czechoslovakia
Olympic bronze medalists for Czechoslovakia
Olympic medalists in ice hockey
Ice hockey players at the 1972 Winter Olympics
Ice hockey players at the 1976 Winter Olympics
Ice hockey players at the 1980 Winter Olympics
Medalists at the 1972 Winter Olympics
Medalists at the 1976 Winter Olympics
HC Dynamo Pardubice players
IIHF Hall of Fame inductees
People from Lomnice nad Popelkou
Sportspeople from the Liberec Region
Czechoslovak expatriate sportspeople in West Germany
Czechoslovak expatriate ice hockey people
Expatriate ice hockey players in West Germany